James Roberts (born 7 January 1891) was a Welsh footballer who earned two caps for the national team in 1913. He played as outside left for Wrexham, Everton, Tranmere Rovers and Crewe Alexandra.

References

1891 births
Year of death missing
Welsh footballers
Wales international footballers
Wrexham A.F.C. players
Tranmere Rovers F.C. players
Everton F.C. players
Crewe Alexandra F.C. players
English Football League players
Association football wingers